Pradeep Batra is an Indian politician and member of the Bharatiya Janata Party. Batra is a member of the Uttarakhand Legislative Assembly from the Roorkee constituency in Haridwar district..

References

External links
 Pradeep Batra	(Bharatiya Janata Party(BJP)):Constituency- ROORKEE(HARIDWAR) - Affidavit Information of Candidate

Bharatiya Janata Party politicians from Uttarakhand
Members of the Uttarakhand Legislative Assembly
Living people
Uttarakhand MLAs 2017–2022
Year of birth missing (living people)